Macedonia participated in the Junior Eurovision Song Contest 2017 which took place on 25 November 2017 in Tbilisi, Georgia. The Macedonian broadcaster MRT was responsible for organising their entry for the contest. Mina Blažev was internally selected on 8 September 2017 as the Macedonian representative and her song for the contest, "Dancing Through Life", was presented on 8 October 2017.

Background

In the 2016 contest, Martija Stanojković represented her country in Valletta, Malta with the song "Love Will Lead Our Way". Despite being one of the fan favorites for the victory and due to the removal of the televote, the song ended 12th out of 17 entries with 41 points.

Before Junior Eurovision
On 8 September 2017, the Macedonian broadcaster revealed that they had chosen the fourteen-year-old artist Mina Blažev internally to represent the Republic of Macedonia in the Junior Eurovision Song Contest 2017. Her song for the contest, "Dancing Through Life" was revealed on 8 October 2017 along with its official music video. It is written and composed by Aleksander Masevski, who also was responsible for the creation of the Macedonian song for the 2016 contest, "Love Will Lead Our Way", performed by Martija Stanojkovic. The song ended unexpectedly in 12th place out of 17 countries with 41 points despite being a huge favorite to win and due to the removal of the televote for the first time.

Artist and song information

Mina Blažev
Mina Blažev (born 12 June 2003) is a Macedonian singer. She represented Macedonia at the Junior Eurovision Song Contest 2017 in Tbilisi, Georgia on 25 November 2017.

Blažev's biggest achievement was winning the special Pearl Award at the International Music Festival "Ezerski Biseri" earlier this year. Mina was also part of a talent show called Pinkove Zvezdice, which is very popular in the Balkan region. To date, she has received a total of seven first prizes, three-second and one third prize in national and international competitions. She attends singing classes at the Zvezdicki Music Academy. Her biggest idols are Ariana Grande and Justin Bieber.

"Dancing Through Life"
"Dancing Through Life" is a song by Macedonian singer Mina Blažev. It represented Macedonia in the Junior Eurovision Song Contest 2017.

At Junior Eurovision
During the opening ceremony and the running order draw which took place on 20 November 2017, Macedonia was drawn to perform eighth on 26 November 2017, following Ireland and preceding Georgia.

Voting

Detailed voting results

References

Junior Eurovision Song Contest
Macedonia
2017